Francesco Tito (Naples, 1863 - 1934) was an Italian painter, mainly of portraits and genre scenes in a Neoclassic style.

Tito was born in Naples in October 1863. He first studied at the Royal Academy of Fine Arts in Naples, before entering Vincenzo Petrocelli's workshop. Petrocelli passed on his expertise to Tito, particularly in genre scenes.

In 1881 at the Promotrice of Naples, he exhibited several paintings, such as Ciò che mi resta or Un momento d'attenzione. At the 1882 International Exposition at Rome, he displayed L'uccellino del mio nido ; at the Promotrici of Genoa, Verona, and Milan : Momenti di gioia. At the Exposition at Milan, he also exhibited a painting titled Winter. At the Promotrice of Naples, he exhibited Woods of Capodimonte.

References

1863 births
1934 deaths
19th-century Italian painters
Italian male painters
Painters from Naples
19th-century Italian male artists